Carol Sykes (born 11 December 1941) is a British archer who represented Great Britain in archery at the 1972 Summer Olympic Games.

Career 

Sykes finished 21st in the women's individual event with a score of 2273 points.

She won the British National Indoor Championships ladies' recurve four times.

References

External links 
 Profile on worldarchery.org

1941 births
Living people
British female archers
Olympic archers of Great Britain
Archers at the 1972 Summer Olympics
Olympic athletes of Great Britain
Female Olympic competitors
20th-century British women